Eugene Wen-chin Wu (Eugene Wu; 1922, Sichuan, China – August 1, 2022, Menlo Park, California) was a China-born American China scholar, bibliographer, and librarian best known for being head of the Harvard-Yenching Library from 1965 to 1997. Wu was an English major at National Central University in wartime China, served as an interpreter between Chinese and American soldiers, and was sent to the United States to help train pilots for the Chinese air force. After earning a degree in Library Science from University of Washington, Seattle he developed the Chinese collection at the Hoover Institution at Stanford University. He worked toward a PhD there, but became head of the Harvard-Yenching Library, where he stayed until retirement in 1997. Wu was a key figure in organizing American Chinese and East Asian libraries.

Education and career 

Wu's father was an official in the Sichuan provincial police and became county magistrate of Xinjin county, near Chengdu, where Wu was born, his family's fifth child.  He studied English at  Central University in Chongqing, as the city was subjected to constant bombing during Second Sino-Japanese War. He volunteered to join the army, and became a translator in the Foreign Affairs Bureau. In 1945 the United States Army asked China to send 100 translators to help train American pilots. Wu became the team leader of these 50 translators. After the end of the war in 1945, he enrolled in the History department of University of Washington. When the university decided to catalogue the one or two thousand Chinese language volumes in their library, Wu became a student assistant. This task started him on his library career. He then went to the Hoover Institution at Stanford, where in 1956, he became deputy director of the Chinese Library. He and Mary Clabaugh Wright worked for several years to assemble documents and publications on the history of the Chinese Communist Party, which became known as the Chen Cheng Collection.

In 1965 he succeeded Alfred Kaiming Ch'iu at the Harvard-Yenching Library, becoming only its second director.

Selected publications 
 ___, Leaders of Twentieth-Century China : An Annotated Bibliography of Selected Chinese Biographical Works in the Hoover Library. Stanford Calif: Stanford University Press; 1956.
 ___ with Berton Peter, Contemporary China: a Research Guide. Stanford Calif: Hoover Institution on War Revolution and Peace. 1967
 ___,  "Recent Developments in Chinese Publishing". The China Quarterly, no. 53, 1973, pp. 134–38. .
 ___, The Harvard-Yenching Library and Its Chinese Local Gazetteers Collection and Other Related Materials: A Brief Survey. Harvard University, 1985.
 ___, Introduction, The Secret Speeches of Chairman Mao : From the Hundred Flowers to the Great Leap Forward. Council on East Asian Studies/Harvard University : Distributed by Harvard University Press 1989
 
 ___, Organizing For East Asian Studies In The United States:The Origins Of The Council On East Asian Libraries, Association For Asian Studies*
 ___,  美國東亞圖書館發展史及其他. (Meiguuo Dongyatushuguan fazhanshi ji qita The history of American Far Eastern Libraries and other things)  聯經出版  Taibei 2016.

References 
 王婉迪 Wang Wandi. 書劍萬里緣 : 吳文津雷頌平合傳 (Shujian Wanliyuan: Wu Wenjin Lei Song Pingje Zhuan The Fate of Books and Swords: A Biography of Wu Wenjin and Lei Songping) Linking  聯經出版 Taibei 2021. 
 Wan Weiying and Wu, Eugene (1998) "Tribute to Eugene Wu", Journal of East Asian Libraries: Vol. 1998 : No. 116 , Article 3

Notes

External links 
 Eugene Wu, Angel Fire
 Interview

1922 births
2022 deaths
American librarians of Chinese descent
Sichuanese
National Central University alumni
Harvard University librarians
Chinese emigrants to the United States
American sinologists
Chinese bibliographers
Wu family
Chinese centenarians